Xianxi Township or Siansi Township (Wade-giles: Hsianhsi) is a rural township in Changhua County, Taiwan with 16,310 residents (January 2023). With an area of 18.1 square kilometres, it is the smallest township in the county.

Administrative divisions
The township comprises eight villages: Dexing, Dingli, Dingzhuang, Gounei, Wenzi, Xiali, Xianxi and Yupu.

References

External links

 Xianxi Government website 

Townships in Changhua County